Tarlok Singh may refer to:

 Tarlok Singh (economist) (died 2005), Indian economist who served the Government of India during the period of Jawaharlal Nehru
 Tarlok Singh (athlete), Indian athlete, winner of the 1962 Arjuna Award
 Tarlok Singh Sandhu (born 1955), Indian Olympic basketball player